Robert J. Moser is a business executive from Saratoga Springs, New York. As of 2010, he was the owner and CEO of Prime Group Holdings, Moser's prior company, Ideal Resorts, was the largest operator of recreational vehicle parks and resorts in the United States. As of 2013, Moser owned and managed over $9.5 billion in real estate assets through his various companies' ownership of apartments, mobile home parks, retail space, office space, self-storage facilities, industrial parks, hotels, and resorts.

Early life and education

Moser grew up in Queensbury, New York. In 1999, he earned a Bachelor of Arts with honors in Economics from Union College in Schenectady, New York; his studies focused on Finance. Moser's honors thesis at Union focused on the valuation of mobile home parks utilizing hedonic and non-hedonic regression analysis, a career field that he took up after graduation.

Career

Moser began purchasing RV parks in 2001, growing his portfolio to 65 parks by 2012. He grew the company with purchases during the beginning of the century, securing approximately 34,000 apartments primarily east of the Mississippi. In 2008, he oversaw the purchase of Indiana Beach, a resort located in Monticello, Indiana, by Ideal Recreation Vacations. The purchase included an amusement park, a water park, restaurants, hotels, and all other operations of the resort. Indiana Beach was sold by Ideal Recreation Vacations to Apex Parks Group in September 2015.

Moser grew Prime Storage Group (Prime Group Holdings) to become the largest private owner of self storage facilities in the world. In 2015, Robert launched Prime Storage Fund I, and in 2017, he created Prime Storage Fund II. Prime Storage Fund II is one of the largest funds raised exclusively for the acquisition of self storage facilities in the United States. 
Prime Storage Fund III(PSFIII) was launched in July 2021, which is largest Prime Fund to date, roughly $2 billion has been raised for this newest vehicle. PSFIII while acquire an estimate $6 billion in real estate over the next 4 years.

Philanthropy
The Moser family supports various charities, including the Moser Family Cleft-Craniofacial Surgical Center at Albany Medical Center.  In 2017 and 2018, the Mosers donated over $5 million to Albany Medical Center; $2.5 million of this sum was used to construct the Children's Emergency Center. Part of the building is named for the Mosers.

Personal life
Moser and his wife, Lisa, have two children.

References

Living people
Union College (New York) alumni
Year of birth missing (living people)
People from Saratoga Springs, New York
People from Queensbury, New York